Norman Edward Betson (8 July 1914 – 5 May 1988) was an Australian rules footballer who played for Essendon in the Victorian Football League (VFL) during the early 1940s.

Before arriving at Essendon, Betson played with Albury and was captain-coach of New South Wales club Culcairn. A follower, he appeared in six finals for Essendon but missed out on a spot in their 1942 premiership team, after only being named an emergency for the Grand Final. Betson did however participate in the 1943 VFL Grand Final and in the dying seconds had a snap at goal which could have secured a draw, only to have the ball touched on the goal-line by a Richmond player.

Betson joined Glenelg in 1946 and spent much of his first year as captain-coach. He continued until 1949 just as a player but spent the 1948 season as captain. During this time he represented the South Australians at interstate football. Betson then captain-coached Nathalia in 1950 and the following season played at Lemnos.

References

Holmesby, Russell and Main, Jim (2007). The Encyclopedia of AFL Footballers. 7th ed. Melbourne: Bas Publishing.

1914 births
Australian rules footballers from Victoria (Australia)
Essendon Football Club players
Glenelg Football Club players
Glenelg Football Club coaches
Albury Football Club players
Shepparton Swans Football Club players
Nathalia Football Club players
1988 deaths